Events in the year 1622 in Spain.

Incumbents
Monarch: Philip IV

Events
February 3 - Siege of Jülich ends with Spanish victory
July 18-October 2 - Siege of Bergen-op-Zoom: Spanish defeated with 5,000 casualties

Births

Deaths

 
1620s in Spain